The 1984 LSU Tigers football team represented Louisiana State University during the 1984 NCAA Division I-A football season. The team was led by Bill Arnsparger in his first season and finished with an overall record of 8–3–1.

During the season, Florida was placed on a postseason ban for violations, and despite finishing first, the SEC punished the program with an immediate postseason ban in addition to the two-year ban imposed for the 1985 and 1986 seasons by the NCAA.  The SEC also awarded LSU, as the highest placed eligible team, the automatic bid to the Sugar Bowl reserved for the conference champion.  Under modern rules, a team ineligible for postseason is also ineligible for postseason awards.

Schedule

Roster

Rankings

Game summaries

at Florida

Wichita State

Arizona

at USC

at Kentucky

Notre Dame

vs. Nebraska (Sugar Bowl)

References

LSU
LSU Tigers football seasons
LSU Tigers football